Qianxi County is a county of Hebei province, China. It contains the northernmost point of Tangshan City which administers it.

Qianxi is known for its chestnuts, producing a third of China's chestnuts export. The history of chestnut cultivation in Qianxi goes back 2,000 years.

Some of the oldest dated rock formation are found in Qianxi as part of the Qianxi stage.

History 
The area of contemporary Qianxi County has long been inhabited by humans. The , a Neolithic archeological site, is located within the county.

A number of brick kilns used in the construction of the Ming Great Wall are located within Qianxi County.

The area saw major fighting during the Japanese invasion of China, involving a number of Chinese generals such as Song Zheyuan and Zhang Zizhong.

Geography 
Qianxi County is located at the southern foothills of the Yan Mountains, near to the Great Wall. The area is mostly rural, and 63% of the county is forested, the second largest proportion among county-level divisions in Hebei.

Climate

Administrative divisions
Qianxi County administers 1 subdistrict, 12 towns, 5 townships, and 1 township-level industrial zone.

Subdistrict 

Towns 

Townships 

Other 
Qianxi County also administers the Lixiang Industrial Industry Cluster as a township-level division.

Economy 
The county had a total gross domestic product of 32.1 billion renminbi as of 2019, of which, 21.1 billion renminbi came from the county's secondary sector.

The area has large iron ore deposits, and a significant steel industry.

The county is a significant rural tourism destination, with major scenic spots including Jingzhong Mountain and Qingshan Pass.

References

County-level divisions of Hebei
Tangshan